Fifita Mounga (born 1 March 1973 in Haasini, Tonga) is a former American rugby union back row forward. He was a member of the United States national rugby union team that participated in the 2007 Rugby World Cup.

References

1973 births
Living people
Tongan emigrants to the United States
Rugby union props
American rugby union players
United States international rugby union players